Álvaro José Rodrigues Valente (24 September 1931 – 21 September 1991), known as just Álvaro, was a Brazilian football player and manager. He played as a forward for Jabaquara, Santos and Atlético Madrid, and appeared in nine official matches for the Brazil national football team in 1955 and 1956. He was also part of Brazil's squad for the 1956 South American Championship.

His brother Ramiro was also a footballer. Both played together at Jabaquara, Santos and Atlético Madrid.

References

External links
 
 

1931 births
1991 deaths
People from Guarujá
Brazilian footballers
Association football forwards
Jabaquara Atlético Clube players
Santos FC players
La Liga players
Atlético Madrid footballers
Brazil international footballers
Brazilian expatriate footballers
Brazilian expatriate sportspeople in Spain
Expatriate footballers in Spain
Brazilian football managers
Marília Atlético Clube managers
Footballers from São Paulo (state)